\Tang Anqi (唐安琪) is a Chinese singer and a former member of the girl group SNH48.

On March 1, 2016, she suffered severe burn injuries on 80% of her body due to a fire in a cafe near the Wanda Plaza, Baoshan District, Shanghai, China. As of April 2016, she is regularly undergoing surgeries and skin grafts. At first, news sources reported that she lit  herself on fire but recent sources are saying that someone else did in an act of attempted murder. It was later confirmed that she was covered in oil and set on fire; it is believed the perpetrator is a fan named "Miyamoto" a girl who is the leader of one of Tang AnQi's larger fanclubs, although no arrest has been made as of 14 September 2016.

Discography

With SNH48

EPs

Albums
 Mae Shika Mukanee (2014)

Units

SNH48 Stage Units

Concert units

References

External links
 Official Member Profile 
 

1992 births
Living people
SNH48 members
Singers from Hubei
People from Huangshi